General elections were held in Papua New Guinea between 15–29 June 2002. Sir Michael Somare's National Alliance Party won the most seats, and he went on to become Prime Minister.

Results

References

Elections in Papua New Guinea
Papua
General
National Parliament of Papua New Guinea
Election and referendum articles with incomplete results